Heggarty is a surname. Notable people with the surname include:

Archie Heggarty (1884–1951), Irish footballer
Jim Heggarty (born 1965), Northern Irish footballer

See also
Hegarty